Are you OK could refer to:
Are You Okay?, an album by art-funk ensemble Was (Not Was)
"Are You OK?", a song from Daniel Caesar's album Case Study 01

See also
R U OK?, an Australian non-profit suicide prevention organisation
RUOK? (album), by Meat Beat Manifesto, 2002
"R U OK" (song), by Tate McRae, 2020